, also known as  or simply JWP, was a Japanese joshi puroresu (women's professional wrestling) promotion, founded in 1992 as a splinter promotion of Japan Women's Pro-Wrestling. Celebrating its 25th anniversary at the time of its folding in 2017, JWP was the oldest joshi puroresu promotion in Japan and its Openweight Championship was the oldest championship in all of joshi. Command Bolshoi, who had worked for the promotion since the beginning, served as the final president of JWP. The promotion's slogan was "Pure Heart, Pure Wrestling".

History

JWP Joshi Puroresu was founded in early 1992, when Japan Women's Pro-Wrestling (JWP), ravaged by internal politics, split up into two camps, dubbed the "shooters" and the "entertainers", and eventually folded on January 18. The "shooter" side went on to form Ladies Legend Pro-Wrestling (LLPW), while the "entertainer" side, led by Jackie Sato and financed by Masatoshi Yamamoto, founded JWP Project, later renamed JWP Joshi Puroresu, which held its first event on April 3, 1992. Already the following year, JWP managed to sign a television deal with the WOWOW channel. In 1994, Jaleco published the  video game for the Super Famicom game console.

JWP's goal from the start was to rival All Japan Women's Pro-Wrestling (AJW), the top joshi puroresu promotion in the country, but always remained in its shadow. After closing the gap between the two promotions in 1996, JWP was hit hard in 1997, when two of its top workers, Candy Okutsu and Hiromi Yagi retired, Dynamite Kansai was sidelined with health problems and finally, when, on August 16, another top worker, Plum Mariko, died in the ring during one of its events. These were followed by Jackie Sato's death from stomach cancer on August 9, 1999. After a co-promoted event with AJW in February 2000 turned out to be a failure, JWP closed its doors at the end of the year. However, the promotion returned just a few months later, now under new management, headed by wrestler Command Bolshoi. JWP continued working with former rival promotion AJW until the promotion folded in April 2005. JWP then adopted AJW's premier wrestling tournament, Tag League the Best, and also inherited the promotion's old sponsor, the Daily Sports newspaper, which led to JWP most notably introducing the Daily Sports Women's Tag Team Championship in August 2008.

JWP not only trained a large number of wrestlers, but was also able to recruit wrestlers from other folding joshi puroresu promotions, including Arisa Nakajima, Leon and Sachie Abe from AtoZ, Kazuki from JDStar and Hanako Nakamori and Tomoko Morii from Ito Dojo, while also employing freelancers such as Emi Sakura, Kana and Misaki Ohata. JWP had a close working relationship with the Ice Ribbon promotion. JWP also had a relationship with American promotion Chikara, with Hanako Nakamori, Tsubasa Kuragaki and Kaori Yoneyama, a replacement for an injured Command Bolshoi, representing the promotion at Chikara's JoshiMania weekend in December 2011. JWP has also participated in Chikara's premier tournament, the King of Trios, on two occasions, with Bolshoi, Kuragaki and Yoneyama participating in 2012, and Bolshoi, Hanako Nakamori and Manami Katsu in 2016.

On February 8, 2017, JWP held a press conference to announce that the promotion would fold following its 25th anniversary event on April 2, 2017, after which all of its wrestlers would become freelancers. The group's contract with the JWP production company was set to expire in April and the two sides had not been able to come to terms on a new one. Bolshoi would remain in charge of Pure Dream kabushiki gaisha, which she had established the previous November and through which she would launch a new promotion on August 11, 2017. The new company would retain control of the Daily Sports Women's Tag Team and Princess of Pro-Wrestling Championships, while the JWP name and the JWP Openweight, Tag Team and Junior Championships all remained with the JWP production company. JWP's folding marked the end of the oldest women's professional wrestling promotion still in operation at that point in time. The following month, it was announced that Bolshoi's new promotion would be called "Pure-J". JWP's final show in Korakuen Hall on April 2, 2017, was attended by 1,180 people, and featured appearances by several wrestlers from the promotion's past, including Azumi Hyuga, Cutie Suzuki, Dynamite Kansai, Hikari Fukuoka, Kayoko Haruyama and Mayumi Ozaki.

Final roster

Wrestlers

Notable alumni/guests

 Akane Fujita
 Aoi Kizuki
 Arisa Nakajima
 Ayako Sato
 Azumi Hyuga
 Candy Okutsu
 Carlos Amano
 Cutie Suzuki
 Devil Masami
 Dynamite Kansai
 Emi Sakura
 Erika Watanabe
 Gami
 Hailey Hatred
 Kiyoko Ichiki
 Hiragi Kurumi
 Hiromi Yagi
 Jackie Sato
 Kana
 Kaori Yoneyama
 Kaoru Ito/Zap I
 Kayoko Haruyama
 Kazuki
 Keiko Aono
 Mayumi Ozaki
 Mika Iida
 Mika Iwata
 Misae Genki
 Misaki Ohata
 Miyuki Takase
 Moon Mizuki
 Nana Kawasa
 Neko Nitta
 Plum Mariko
 Rabbit Miu
 Ran Yu-Yu
 Sachie Abe
 Sawako Shimono
 Sakura Hirota
 Saki
 Sayaka Obihiro
 Saya
 Tomoko Watanabe/Zap T
 Toshie Uematsu
 Tsubasa Kuragaki
 Yuu Yamagata

Staff
 Tessy Sugo (referee)

Championships

Tournaments

References

External links

  
 Official blog 
 
 JWP Joshi Puroresu on YouTube

 
1992 establishments in Japan
2017 disestablishments in Japan
Adachi, Tokyo
Japanese women's professional wrestling promotions
Sports competitions in Tokyo
Puroresu